Deutschnofen is a comune (municipality) in the province of South Tyrol in northern Italy, located about  southeast of the city of Bolzano.
 
Deutschnofen borders the following municipalities: Aldein, Bolzano, Bronzolo, Karneid, Laives, Welschnofen, and municipalities of Predazzo, Tesero and Varena in Trentino. It includes the villages of Rauth (Novale) and Obereggen, a small tourist village located on the foot of the Latemar, with some 900 inhabitants.

Deutschnofen shares 7 km of the frontier with Trentino. The Brantental valley connects it with Laives.

The municipality of Deutschnofen contains the frazioni (subdivisions, mainly villages and hamlets) Petersberg (Italian: Monte San Pietro) and Eggen (Italian: San Nicolò d'Ega).

Coat-of-arms
The coat of arms is party per fess of argent and gules crossed, from edge to edge, from a knotty sable branch. The color argent symbolizes the deposits of dolomite and the gules ones those of porphyry; the branch represents the woodiness of the municipality. The emblem was adopted in 1969.

Linguistic distribution
According to the 2011 census, 97.42% of the population speak German, 2.33% Italian and 0.25% Ladin as first language.

References

External links

 Official website 
Obereggen Official Website

Municipalities of South Tyrol